Nilsen Plateau is a rugged, ice-covered plateau in Antarctica. When including Fram Mesa, the plateau is about 30 nautical miles (60 km) long and 1 to 12 nautical miles (22 km) wide, rising to 3,940 m between the upper reaches of the Amundsen and Scott Glaciers, in the Queen Maud Mountains. Discovered in November 1911 by the Norwegian expedition under Roald Amundsen, and named by him for Captain Thorvald Nilsen, commander of the ship Fram. The highest peak in Nilsen Plateau is unnamed and has an elevation of 3940 metres.

Crown Mountain surmounts the west side of the plateau.

References

Plateaus of Antarctica
Landforms of the Ross Dependency
Amundsen Coast